, also titled Undercurrent and River of Night, is a 1956 Japanese drama film directed by Kōzaburō Yoshimura. It was Yoshimura's first film photographed in colour. The screenplay by Sumie Tanaka is based on a novel by Hisao Sawano.

Plot
Kiwa Funaki is a young successful kimono designer working at her family's Kyoto-based business. While she fends off both the admiration of young painter Goro and the obtrusive advances of business partner Omiya, she eventually falls in love with scientist Takemura, who is writing a paper on the Shojobae fly. After she has started an affair with him, Kiwa learns that Takemura has a wife terminally ill with tuberculosis. When Takemura's wife finally dies, he proposes to her, but Kiwa, criticising him for his egotism, chooses her independence over the prospect of becoming his wife.

Cast
 Fujiko Yamamoto as Kiwa Funaki
 Ken Uehara as Takemura
 Eitarō Ozawa as Omiya
 Michiko Ai as Setsuko
 Eijirō Tōno as Yūjirō, Kiwa's father
 Kazuko Ichikawa as Atsuko, Takemura's daughter
 Michiko Ono as Miyo, Kiwa's sister
 Kimiko Tachibana as Mitsu, Kiwa's stepmother
 Mineko Yorozuyo as Yasushi, Omiya's wife
 Keizo Kawasaki as Gora Okamoto

Release history
Night River was released in Japan on 12 September 1956 and shown under the title Undercurrent at the 1957 New York Japanese Film Festival. It was released on DVD in Japan in 2007.

Awards
1956 Mainichi Film Award for Best Supporting Actor (Eijirō Tōno for Night River and two other films) and Best Sound Recording (Yukio Kaihara for Night River and three other films).

References

External links
 
 

1956 films
1956 drama films
Japanese drama films
Daiei Film films
Films based on Japanese novels
Films directed by Kōzaburō Yoshimura
Films set in Kyoto
1950s Japanese films